Éverton Augusto de Barros Ribeiro (born 10 April 1989) is a Brazilian footballer who plays as an attacking midfielder or winger for Campeonato Brasileiro Série A club Flamengo and the Brazil national team.

Formed at Corinthians, after a loan at São Caetano he was sold to Coritiba in 2011, winning the Campeonato Paranaense in both of his seasons. He also won Série A twice at Cruzeiro, being voted the best player of each season. He joined Al-Ahli Dubai for €15 million in 2014, winning several items of silverware in the United Arab Emirates before returning to Brazil with Flamengo in 2017.

A full international since 2014, Ribeiro represented Brazil at the Copa América in 2015, 2021 and 2022 FIFA World Cup.

Club career

Corinthians
Born in Arujá but raised in Santa Isabel, both in the state of São Paulo, Ribeiro joined Corinthians' youth setup in 2001, aged ten, as a left back. Promoted to the main squad in 2007 by manager Paulo César Carpegiani, he only appeared in four matches during that year, being relegated with the side.

São Caetano (loan)
On 21 July 2008, after the arrival of Wellington Saci, Ribeiro was loaned to São Caetano, being successfully converted to an attacking midfielder during his two-year spell at the side.

Coritiba
Ribeiro returned to Timão in January 2011, but was sold to Coritiba for a R$1.5 million fee on 21 February. He made eight appearances as the team won the year's Campeonato Paranaense, scoring in the third minute on 17 April to open a 4–1 win at Roma Esporte Apucarana.

The following season, Ribeiro scored five times in 15 games as the team defended their title. On 6 May 2012, in the first leg of the final away to rivals Clube Atlético Paranaense, he opened a 2–2 draw. A week later, he struck the decisive effort as his team won in a penalty shootout at the Estadio Major Antonio do Couto Pereira.

Ribeiro finished the 2012 campaign for Coxa as the club's topscorer in Série A along with teammate Deivid, with eight goals. On 26 August 2012, Ribeiro was sent off in a 3–1 loss at Figueirense for a foul on Fernandes.

Cruzeiro
On 8 January 2013, Cruzeiro reached an agreement with Coritiba for Ribeiro, and he signed a four-year deal three days later.

Ribeiro was a key attacking unit for Raposa during his two-year spell, along with Ricardo Goulart. He was also elected Série A's best player of the year twice in a row, as his side was crowned champions twice.

Al-Ahli
After being linked to Manchester United, Milan, Monaco and Real Madrid during the 2015 winter transfer window, Ribeiro moved to Al-Ahli Dubai on 2 February 2015 for a reported €15 million transfer fee.

Two days later, he made his debut in the seasons's UAE Arabian Gulf League, opening a 2–0 home win over Al-Sharjah from Luis Jiménez's assist, a minute after replacing Habib Fardan. He won his first silverware with the club on 27 March, coming on as a substitute at the end of the Super Cup 1–0 win over Al Ain at the Mohammed Bin Zayed Stadium in Abu Dhabi. He finished the campaign with 3 goals in 12 league games. In the year's AFC Champions League, he struck 4 goals in 14 matches, including one in the semi-final second leg 4–3 aggregate victory over Al-Hilal; the team lost the continental final by one goal to Guangzhou Evergrande Taobao.

On 19 August 2015, in the first game of the new national season, Ribeiro scored twice – including a penalty kick – in an 8–1 home win over Al-Fujairah, and assisted compatriot Lima for two more. His team won the league, and Ribeiro told the media that the victory justified his surprise transfer to the team.

Flamengo
On 5 June 2017, an associate of Ribeiro said that he had rescinded his contract with Al Ahli in order to return to Brazilian football. Later that day he signed with Flamengo, who paid €6 million for 100% of his economic rights, under a contract that runs until 2021.

On 13 December 2019 Ribeiro extended his contract with Flamengo until December 2023.

International career
After representing Brazil in the under-20 level, Ribeiro was called up to the main for two matches against Colombia and Ecuador by new manager Dunga on 19 August 2014. He made his debut for Brazil in a friendly against Colombia on 5 September, coming on as a substitute for Willian in a 1–0 win at Sun Life Stadium, Miami.

On 5 May 2015, Ribeiro was called up for the year's Copa América, held in Chile. In the quarter-final against Paraguay, he replaced goalscorer Robinho for the final three minutes of a 1–1 draw, and then missed in the penalty shootout which eliminated Brazil.

On 17 June 2021, he scored the third goal in a 4–0 win over Peru in Brazil's second group match of the 2021 Copa América on home soil.

On 7 November 2022, Ribeiro was named in the squad for the 2022 FIFA World Cup.

Career statistics

Club

International

International goals
As of match played 9 September 2021. Brazil score listed first, score column indicates score after each Ribeiro goal.

Honours
Coritiba
Campeonato Paranaense: 2011, 2012

Cruzeiro
Campeonato Brasileiro Série A: 2013, 2014
Campeonato Mineiro:2014

Al Ahli
UAE League: 2015–16
UAE Super Cup: 2014, 2016
UAE League Cup: 2016–17
AFC Champions League runner-up: 2015

Flamengo
Copa Libertadores: 2019, 2022
Recopa Sudamericana: 2020
Campeonato Brasileiro Série A: 2019, 2020
 Copa do Brasil: 2022
Supercopa do Brasil: 2020, 2021
Campeonato Carioca: 2019, 2020, 2021
Brazil U20
South American U-20 Championship: 2009
Individual
Campeonato Brasileiro Série A Best Player: 2013, 2014
Campeonato Brasileiro Série A Team of the Year: 2013, 2014, 2019
Campeonato Brasileiro Série A top assist provider: 2013, 2014
Campeonato Brasileiro Série A Fan-Voted Best Player: 2019
Bola de Ouro: 2013
Bola de Prata: 2013
Campeonato Carioca Team of the Year: 2019, 2020
Copa Libertadores Team of the Tournament: 2019, 2022
South American Team of the Year: 2022

Personal life
Ribeiro is married to Marília Nery since 2013 and has two children. He is Roman Catholic.

References

External links

1989 births
Living people
Footballers from São Paulo (state)
Brazilian footballers
Brazilian Roman Catholics
Association football midfielders
Campeonato Brasileiro Série A players
Campeonato Brasileiro Série B players
Sport Club Corinthians Paulista players
Associação Desportiva São Caetano players
Coritiba Foot Ball Club players
Cruzeiro Esporte Clube players
Copa Libertadores-winning players
UAE Pro League players
Al Ahli Club (Dubai) players
CR Flamengo footballers
Brazil under-20 international footballers
Brazil youth international footballers
Brazil international footballers
2015 Copa América players
2021 Copa América players
2022 FIFA World Cup players
Brazilian expatriate footballers
Expatriate footballers in the United Arab Emirates
Brazilian expatriate sportspeople in the United Arab Emirates
People from Santa Isabel, São Paulo